Jacobs Wind Electric Co. Inc. is a renewable energy company in the United States. The firm was started and established by Marcellus and Joseph Jacobs, after local interest in their wind electric system for their family's Montana Ranch, built in 1922, brought them requests from neighbours to provide them with wind generated electric power as well.

M.L. & Joe moved the firm to Minneapolis in 1963 to begin production of improved wind/engine distributed energy systems which were sold in the U.S., Canada, Mexico, and outside of North America, through a Dealer network that grew to over 300. Early Jacobs' machines included one taken to Antarctica by Richard Evelyn Byrd and installed at Byrd's 'Little America' in 1933, running until 1955. Before production ceased in the late 1950s, about 20,000 Jacobs Wind Energy Systems (1–3 kW) were shipped from Minneapolis.

In the 1980s, Jacobs Wind Electric Co. partnered with Control Data to develop a new line of wind energy systems capable of producing 10-20 kW of electricity. Over 1,500 of these larger systems were manufactured between 1980 and 1985, with many being connected to the grid. A significant number were installed in pioneering wind farms in Hawaii and California.

Jacobs wind systems were also connected to Rural Electric Cooperative (REC) grids in Minnesota from 1981 onwards. Many of these systems are still in operation, generating renewable wind power for sale to REC grids (AG-WATTS).

References

 Robert Righter, Wind Energy in America. Norman, Okla. : University of Oklahoma Press, April 1996. 361pp.

External links
US Patent 4228361 - Wind electric plant with improved alternator field excitation - details 1 of at least 3 patents
Jacobs Wind Electric Company, Inc
Wind Turbine Industries
greentechhistory.com - SERI Archive film, interview
Wind-Works -  Photos, details many Jacobs machines

Wind turbine manufacturers
Renewable energy companies of the United States
Companies based in Minnesota